William Burns Caldwell III (July 20, 1925 – March 17, 2013) was a United States Army general who retired as the Fifth United States Army commanding general at Fort Sam Houston in San Antonio. A combat veteran of wars in Korea and Vietnam, he was awarded the Silver Star on three separate occasions for gallantry and heroism under fire. Coming from a long line of soldiers, his great-great-great-great grandfather, Thomas Maze, fought in the Revolutionary War, his grandfather served in the Union Army during the Civil War, his father was an army colonel during World War II, and his son William B. Caldwell IV is a retired lieutenant general with tours in Iraq and Afghanistan.

Early life and education
Caldwell was born on July 20, 1925 at Fort Moultrie, South Carolina, into a military family. His father was a soldier, and his grandfather fought for the Union Army in the American Civil War.

Both of his parents were natural leaders and their home overflowed with friends associated with the military. Young Bill Caldwell basked in their camaraderie, emulated their character, and looked forward to the day when he could wear an officer's uniform.

When Caldwell was 16, he lived with his family at Schofield Barracks, Hawaii. On December 7, 1941, the Caldwells were horror-struck as they heard the roar of Japanese planes attack Pearl Harbor and witnessed a Japanese plane strafe an officer running down their street. The next day, Bill helped at the base hospital and for the weeks that followed, drove an ammunition truck. Dependents were later evacuated from Hawaii; Bill, his mother, and his sister moved to Los Angeles where he finished high school.

One of Caldwell's childhood dreams was to attend West Point, but he did not think he could get in and almost enlisted in the Marine Corps. He later said, "When the telegram came telling my family and me that I was accepted into West Point and I was to report there in two days or three days, I immediately caught a train out of El Paso and went to West Point."

Military career
Commissioned as second lieutenant in the infantry in 1948, Caldwell attended ground general school at Fort Riley, Kansas and the Infantry School at Fort Benning in Columbus, Georgia. While in Columbus, he met his future wife Tudy Dismuke. Soon after their marriage, Second Lieutenant Caldwell was assigned to the 1st Battalion, 34th Infantry Regiment, 24th Infantry Division, which served as a Japanese occupation force on Kyushu. His unit was later deployed to Korea and was one of the first U.S. combat troops there. For heroism and gallantry in the Korean War, he was awarded two Silver Stars and a Bronze Star with Valor.

After the Korean War, Caldwell served in a variety of command staff positions in the United States and Europe. In 1954, Caldwell served as Operations Officer for the 1st Infantry Division in Germany and in Fort Riley, Kansas. As he departed Fort Riley, his efficiency report highlighted that he is "...a positive and incisive thinker and meticulous planner... natural leader... possesses a well-developed sense of humor, tact and diplomacy." 

Caldwell served at West Point twice during his career. First, as a tactical officer in 1960 and again as the commander of the Second Regiment of the U.S. Cadet Corps from 1968 to 1969. Caldwell loved West Point and imparted his tactical knowledge, dedication to the Army, and his leadership philosophy to the Corps of Cadets.

During the Vietnam War, he served as a brigade commander for the 1st Brigade, 1st Infantry Division.

When his brigade was under assault, Colonel Caldwell directed a counter-assault and was awarded his third Silver Star and the Distinguished Flying Cross. After brigade command, he remained in Vietnam and served as a senior military advisor at the Civil Operations Development Center, III Corps.

After a combat tour in the Vietnam War and his tour at the U.S. Military Academy, Caldwell and his family boarded the Queen Mary for an assignment at NATO's Supreme Headquarters Allied Powers Europe (SHAPE). After three years in Belgium, he and his family moved to Germany where he served as Assistant Division Commander (Maneuver) of the Fourth and later the First Armored Division.

In 1973, Caldwell returned with his family to Washington, D.C. where he oversaw the dissemination of all foreign military aid from the Office of the Secretary of Defense. Then, he commanded the Army Training Center at Fort Jackson, South Carolina. He instituted the post's motto, "Victory Starts Here." In 1975, Time magazine did a profile of training the post-Vietnam War U.S. Army. Caldwell, who oversaw the effort to train an all-volunteer force said, "Our mission is to develop a highly motivated, disciplined soldier who knows the basic skills of his craft. Unlike the Marines—and I don't mean to criticize them—we don't first break a man down and then rebuild him. We think that he should be able to think for himself. He should respond to orders, but we don't want to set him in a mold." Caldwell's installation was also considered to be the most gender friendly in the country and he actively supported the recruitment and integration of women in the U.S. Army.

He held two final command positions before retirement in 1980. His penultimate position was as commander for Readiness Region VI at Fort Knox, Kentucky. And in July 1978, he was promoted to lieutenant general and assumed command of Fifth Army at Fort Sam Houston in San Antonio. At Fifth Army, he oversaw the training of about 270,000 National Guardsmen and Army Reservists.

Korean War
Caldwell's regiment was among the first U.S. forces committed to combat in Korea in July 1950. Like many units at the time, Caldwell's regiment was understrengthed and ill-equipped for combat with North Korean forces. The regiment had no tank company and virtually no anti-tank capability. Much of their ammunition was old and the unit had limited medical support. The forces arrived in the port of Pusan in an old Japanese hospital ship and then pushed north via train to Taejon. At Pyongtek south of Suwon Air Base, Caldwell's regiment set up defensive positions with "Task Force Smith."

On July 19, 1950, a North Korean company ambushed Caldwell's platoon. Awarded his first Silver Star that day, the citation read "without regard for his own safety, he personally led an assault on the enemy's lines, and the men, inspired by his gallant example, overran the position... He fearlessly advanced into the face of withering fire, killed four of the enemy, reached his fallen men, and directed their evacuation to friendly positions." The following day, American forces led by General William Dean were decimated. Lieutenant Caldwell and Captain Micky Marks scouted for help and commandeered a train to Yosu, which enabled the evacuation of their men who had no food or water for five days.

Within two months of arriving on the Korean Peninsula, only 168 of the original 1,968 men remained. Caldwell's battalion was combined with others to become the 3rd Battalion, 19th Infantry, 24th Infantry Division.  Bill had come to Korea as a platoon leader, but assumed company command and received a battlefield promotion to captain on August 30, 1950. With reinforcements, Caldwell's unit broke out of the Pusan Perimeter in early September and steadily proceeded northward to North Korea's capital by Thanksgiving.

After the Chinese reinforced North Korea, American forces were pushed back. On February 3, 1951, Captain Caldwell led "L" Company, 19th Infantry Regiment to secure the approaches to the Han River. The enemy counter-attacked, but Caldwell's company rallied. He was awarded a second Silver Star that day. Part of the citation read, "With the enemy about to overrun his positions and the entire perimeter in danger, Captain Caldwell, completely disregarding personal safety, once again rallied his men and personally led a daring counterattack, employing rifles and grenades, which broke the back of the enemy's attack and forced him to withdraw leaving an estimated 100 dead." Caldwell redeployed from Korea in August 1951. He later remarked, "After Korea, you knew you could do anything. We had tackled the very worst that could ever happen."

Vietnam War

Five months after the birth of his last child, the newly appointed Colonel Caldwell reported for duty in Vietnam from 1967–8 initially as commander of the 1st Brigade, 1st Infantry Division.

On February 24, 1967, Caldwell learned that his brigade was under heavy assault near Ap Gu and flew to the combat zone. He initially directed fire from the air; after his helicopter landed in a non-secure area, Caldwell directed the counter-assault from the ground with his troops. Because of his actions that day, he was awarded his third Silver Star for gallantry in action against a hostile force. The citation partly read, "Although continuously exposed to intensive hostile fire... Through superb planning and tireless supervision... With complete disregard for his personal safety... His presence in the areas of heaviest conflict greatly inspired his men and they soon routed the large insurgent force." For his heroism that day, Caldwell also received the Distinguished Flying Cross.

From September 1967 to January 1968, Caldwell served as a senior military advisor at the Civil Operations Development Center, III Corps. In this capacity, he oversaw the training and equipping of the South Vietnamese paramilitary forces. While not exercising command and control of RVN forces, he was present during many battles advising RVN commanders on tactics.

Major permanent duty assignments
Chief, Strategic Plans Branch, Supreme Headquarters Allied Powers Europe
Assistant Division Commander, 4th Armored Division, United States Army, Europe
Assistant Division Commander, 1st Armored Division, United States Army, Europe
Chief of Staff, VII Corps, United States Army, Europe
Deputy Director, Security Assistance Plans, Policy, and Programs, Office, Assistant Secretary of Defense
Director, Security Assistance, Plans and Programs Formulation, Office, Assistant Secretary of Defense
Commanding General, United States Army Training Center and Fort Jackson, South Carolina
Commanding General, United States Army Readiness Region VI, Fort Knox, Kentucky
Commanding General, 5th Army

Education
Caldwell spent one semester at Texas A&M University before attending Millard's Preparatory School in Washington, D.C.. From there, he was accepted to the United States Military Academy at West Point, New York. At West Point, he was among the top five for physical achievement and earned A's for boxing and golf. He also served as a member of the Brigade Staff. After graduation from West Point in 1948, Caldwell served in posts throughout the country and the world.

After serving as the operations officer for the 1st Division in Germany, he attended Command and General Staff College at Fort Leavenworth, Kansas. During 1963–64, he attended the National War College and George Washington University, where he earned a master's degree in international relations.

Military schools
The Infantry School, Basic (1949) and Advanced (1954) Courses
The Command and General Staff College (1957)
United Kingdom Joint Services Staff College (1961)
The National War College (1964)

Dates of rank
 2LT – 1948
 1LT – 1950
 CPT – 1950 (battlefield promotion)
 MAJ – 1954
 LTC –  1960
 COL – 1966
 BG – 1969
 MG – 1973
 LTG – 1978

Awards and decorations

Personal
Caldwell married Theresa Knight "Tudy" Dismuke in 1949. They had five children together, but she died about a year after his retirement from the Army. Caldwell and his wife were buried at the Fort Benning Main Post Cemetery.

References

External links

 Military Orders, Decorations, and Medals of the Republic of Vietnam 1955–1975

1925 births
2013 deaths
People from Charleston County, South Carolina
People from Los Angeles
Texas A&M University alumni
United States Army personnel of the Korean War
Recipients of the Silver Star
United States Army Command and General Staff College alumni
National War College alumni
Elliott School of International Affairs alumni
United States Army personnel of the Vietnam War
Recipients of the Air Medal
Recipients of the Distinguished Flying Cross (United States)
Recipients of the Distinguished Service Order (Vietnam)
Recipients of the Legion of Merit
United States Army generals
Recipients of the Distinguished Service Medal (US Army)
People from Columbus, Georgia